Randolph W. Washington (1852 - ?) was a teacher and state legislator in Florida. He represented Jefferson County, Florida in the Florida House of Representatives in 1885. His post office was in Monticello, Florida.

See also
African American officeholders during and following the Reconstruction era

References

1852 births
Year of death missing
African-American state legislators in Florida
People from Monticello, Florida